Dorian Junior Hanza Meha (born 12 May 2001), known as Dorian Jr., is a professional footballer who plays as a forward for CD Leganés B, on loan from Cultural Leonesa. Born in Spain, he represents the Equatorial Guinea national team.

Early life
Dorian Jr. was born in Fuenlabrada to Equatoguinean Bubi parents.

Club career
Dorian Jr. is a CD Atlético Fuenlabreño and Alcobendas CF product. He has played for EI San Martín and Langreo in Spain.

International career
Dorian Jr. made his senior debut for Equatorial Guinea on 16 November 2021.

Career statistics

International

References

External links

2001 births
Living people
Citizens of Equatorial Guinea through descent
Equatoguinean footballers
Association football forwards
Equatorial Guinea international footballers
2021 Africa Cup of Nations players
Bubi people
People from Fuenlabrada
Footballers from the Community of Madrid
Spanish footballers
Cultural Leonesa footballers
UP Langreo footballers
CD Leganés B players
Tercera División players
Segunda Federación players
Spanish sportspeople of Equatoguinean descent
Spanish people of Bubi descent